Sigismund (died 524 AD) was King of the Burgundians from 516 until his death. He was the son of king Gundobad and Caretene. He succeeded his father in 516. Sigismund and his brother Godomar were defeated in battle by Clovis's sons, and Godomar fled. Sigismund was captured by Chlodomer, King of Orléans, where he was kept as a prisoner. Later he, his wife and his children were executed. Godomar then rallied the Burgundian army and won back his kingdom.

Life 
Sigismund was a student of Avitus of Vienne, the Chalcedonian bishop of Vienne who converted Sigismund from the Arian faith of his Burgundian forebears. Sigismund was inspired to found a monastery dedicated to Saint Maurice at Agaune in Valais in 515. The following year he became king of the Burgundians.

Sigismund's conflict with Bishop Apollinaris
Sigismund came into conflict with Apollinaris of Valence over the rules regarding marriage. The king's treasurer, Stephen, was living in flagrant incest. The four bishops of the province ordered him to separate from his companion, but he appealed to Sigismund, who supported his official and exiled the four bishops to Sardinia. They refused to yield, and after some time the King relented, and permitted three of them to return to their Sees, with the exception of Apollinaris, whose defiance had made him particularly obnoxious to the King. He was kept a close prisoner for a year. At last the King, stricken with a severe illness, sent the Queen to request Apollinaris go to the court to restore the monarch to health. On his refusal, the Queen asked for his cloak to place on the sufferer. The request was granted, the King recovered, and Apollinaris was allowed to return to his see.

Murder of his son
According to Gregory of Tours, Sigismund married the daughter of the Ostrogoth King Theodoric. They had a son, Sigeric. The widowed Sigismund later remarried, and his second wife "maltreated and insulted her stepson". When, on a feast day in 517, Sigeric saw his stepmother dressed in his late mother's ceremonial clothes, he called out that she was unworthy to wear them. (Under Burgundian law, his mother's clothes should have gone to his sister, Suavegotha.) The Queen persuaded Sigismund to deal with his son, alleging that Sigeric planned not only to kill his father and seize the throne, but that he also had designs on his grandfather's kingdom in Italy. Sigismund ordered the young man to be taken while drunk and drowned in a well. Then, overcome with remorse, Sigismund retreated to the monastery that he had founded.

Burgundian War, defeat and death of Sigismund
In 523, Clotilde, daughter of Chilperic II of Burgundy who had been slain by Sigismund's father Gundobad in 493, took revenge for the murder of her father, when she incited her sons against Sigismund, and provoked the Burgundian War, which led to Sigismund's deposition and imprisonment, and his assassination the following year. In 523, the Kingdom of the Burgundians was invaded by the four Frankish kings, Chlodomer, Childebert I, Clotaire I and Theuderic I, children of Frankish king Clovis I and Sigismund's first cousins once removed by Clotilde. Sigismund and his brother Godomar led the Burgundian defence but lost the battle. Godomar fled while Sigismund put on a monk's habit and hid in a cell near his abbey. He was captured by Chlodomer, king of Aurelianum (modern Orléans), beheaded and his body thrown in a well. Sigismund's wife and remaining children were also put to death.

Aftermath
Sigismund was succeeded on the throne by his brother Godomar. Godomar then rallied the Burgundian army and called for aid from his ally, the Ostrogothic king Theodoric the Great. Godomar regained his territory; the garrisons that the Franks had left behind were massacred.

Chlodomer marched with his brother Theuderic I, King of Metz, on Burgundy in 524. Chlodomer was killed at the Battle of Vézeronce, which took place on 25 June 524, reportedly at the hands of Godomar.

Veneration 

In 535, Sigismund's remains were recovered from the well at Coulmiers and buried in the monastery at Agaune. Eventually Sigismund was canonized. Correspondence has survived between Sigismund and Avitus of Vienne, who was a poet and one of the last masters of the classical literary arts.

In 1366, Charles IV, Holy Roman Emperor, transferred Sigismund's relics to Prague, hence he has become a patron saint of the Kingdom of Bohemia, now Czech Republic. 

The emperor gave the saint's name to one of his sons, the later King Sigismund of Hungary (who also became decades later King of Bohemia and Holy Roman Emperor). In 1424, Sigismund of Hungary constructed a church in the honor of Saint Sigismund in the City of Buda. The same year, King Sigismund took the relics of Saint Sigismund from Prague and sent them to the Hungarian city of Varad to protect them from the Hussites.

Family and issue 
In 494, he married Ostrogotha, the illegitimate daughter of Theoderic the Great and a concubine, as a part of Theoderic's negotiation for an alliance with Sigismund and the Burgundians. They had the following issue:

 Sigeric (494/95 – 517), murdered by his own father.
 Suavegotha (495/96 – ?), married to Theuderic I, son of Clovis I.
 Daughter, name unknown

See also 
 Statues of Saints Norbert, Wenceslaus and Sigismund

References

External links 

 
 Saints and Blessed Page

Kings of the Burgundians
5th-century births
523 deaths
6th-century Christian martyrs
6th-century monarchs in Europe
People executed by decapitation
Christian royal saints
Roman Catholic royal saints